Abdias may refer to:

Obadiah or Abdias, a Biblical theophorical name
Book of Abdias, the shortest book in the Hebrew Bible
Abdias of Babylon, said to have been one of the Seventy Apostles mentioned in the Gospel of Luke
Abdas of Susa or Abdias, a bishop of Susa in Iran
Abdias, a deacon and companion in martyrdom of Abda and Abdjesus

People
Abdias do Nascimento (1914–2011), Afro-Brazilian scholar, artist, and politician
Abdias Maurel (died 1705), Camisard leader

See also
Abdia, a village in Howmeh Rural District, Central District. Damghan County, Semnan Province, Iran